The Horwich Branch was a  double track branch Lancashire and Yorkshire Railway built branch line that ran from two forks either side of Blackrod railway station on the Manchester to Preston Line to  also serving the Horwich Works.

History

Opening
The line opened on 14 February 1870 to serve the town of Horwich, but by 1884 the land to the east of the line south of the town had been chosen for a major locomotive works.

Horwich station closure
Horwich Railway Station closed to passenger traffic on 27 September 1965, and goods the next year. The line to Horwich Works remained open until their closure in 1983.

Horwich Parkway station opening
Thirty-four years later Horwich Parkway railway station opened in 1999, adjacent to Reebok Stadium. The nearest railway station to much of Horwich (including the town centre), however, is Blackrod.

References

External links
Horwich Railway Station Disused Stations
Horwich Railway Station
Line on a 1948 OS Map

Horwich
Closed railway lines in North West England
Rail transport in Lancashire
Railway lines opened in 1870